Matthew Grzelcyk (born January 5, 1994) is an American professional ice hockey defenseman. He is currently playing with the  Boston Bruins of the National Hockey League (NHL). He was selected by the Bruins with the 85th overall pick in the 3rd round of the 2012 NHL Entry Draft.

Playing career
As a youth, Grzelcyk played in the 2007 Quebec International Pee-Wee Hockey Tournament with the Middlesex Islanders minor ice hockey team, along with teammates Jon Gillies and Miles Wood.

Grzelcyk attended Belmont Hill School before joining the USNTDP of the USHL, winning a gold medal at the 2012 U18 World Juniors in the Czech Republic. He committed to play for Boston University in the Hockey East Conference of the NCAA.

He was named to the Hockey East All-Freshman team in 2012. He was selected to the preliminary roster for the 2013 World Juniors but did not make the final cut.

He served as captain of the Terriers his junior and senior season. He was named an assistant captain at the 2014 World Juniors but the US did not medal. He scored the overtime winning goal in the 63rd Beanpot that gave BU their 30th title, and was named the tournament MVP. He played 124 games during his four-year career at BU, scoring 26 goals and assisting on 69.

On April 1, 2016, he signed a two-year entry-level deal with the Boston Bruins, starting with the 2016–17 season. He joined Boston's affiliate Providence Bruins of the American Hockey League (AHL) on an Amateur Tryout Agreement for the rest of the 2015–16 campaign.

On December 14, 2016, Grzelcyk made his NHL debut with the Bruins in a 4–3 OT loss to the Pittsburgh Penguins.

Grzelcyk spent 6 weeks of the 2017-2018 season playing with the Providence Bruins before returning to the NHL on November 22, 2017 

On November 22, 2017, in a game against the New Jersey Devils, Grzelcyk got his first NHL assist on a goal from teammate Jake DeBrusk. On November 24, 2017, Grzelcyk scored his first NHL goal in a 4-3 victory over the Pittsburgh Penguins.

During the summer before the 2018–19 season, Grzelcyk signed a two year contract to stay with the Bruins. Grzelcyk and the Bruins qualified for the 2019 Stanley Cup Finals, where he suffered a head injury as the result of an elbow to the head by Blues center Oskar Sundqvist. Sundqvist was suspended for Game 3 of the finals, although the Blues eventually won the Stanley Cup.

Personal life
Grzelcyk's father and older brother, both named John, work at TD Garden. John Grzelcyk Sr. started working at Boston Garden in 1967 and has stayed with the organization ever since. On October 25, 2021 Grzelcyk's father was diagnosed with prostate cancer, while undergoing radiation treatments John Sr. continued work at TD Garden. The two elder Grzelcyks are members of the arena's "bull gang", which converts the building from hockey to basketball and back: John Jr. is also a Zamboni driver for certain Bruins games.

Growing up, Grzelcyk lived a block from the Charlestown rink at Edwards Playground. He also grew up with fellow 2012 NHL Entry Draft pick Jimmy Vesey. The two first met when they were around the age of six, playing hockey together for a team named the Middlesex Islanders.

Career statistics

Regular season and playoffs

International

References

External links

1994 births
Living people
Boston Bruins draft picks
Boston Bruins players
Boston University alumni
Boston University Terriers men's ice hockey players
Ice hockey people from Boston
Providence Bruins players
USA Hockey National Team Development Program players
Belmont Hill School alumni
American men's ice hockey defensemen
AHCA Division I men's ice hockey All-Americans